Jared Olsen (born October 10, 1987) is an American politician and a Republican member of the Wyoming House of Representatives representing District 11 since January 10, 2017.

Career
Prior to his election to the state legislature, Olsen was chairman of the Laramie County Republican Party. He is also an attorney in Cheyenne.  After the 2020 election, Olsen was also elected to be the Majority Whip of the house.

Elections

2016
Olsen challenged incumbent Democratic Representative and House Minority Leader Mary Throne for the seat. He ran unopposed in the Republican primary and defeated Throne in the general election with 51% of the vote.

2018
Olsen ran unopposed in the August 21, 2018 Republican Primary and defeated Calob Taylor, a Democrat, in the November 6, 2018 General Election with 1,275 votes (53.6%).

2020
Olsen ran unopposed in the August 18, 2020 Republican Primary and defeated Amy Spieker, a Democrat, in the November 3, 2020 General Election with 1,807 votes (55.0%).

References

External links
Official page at the Wyoming Legislature
Profile from Ballotpedia

Living people
Republican Party members of the Wyoming House of Representatives
Politicians from Cheyenne, Wyoming
University of Wyoming alumni
Weber State University alumni
1987 births
People from Evanston, Wyoming
21st-century American politicians